Georgia's 2nd congressional district is a congressional district in the U.S. state of Georgia. The district is currently represented by Democrat Sanford D. Bishop, Jr.

Georgia's largest district by land area, it comprises much of the southwestern portion of the state. Much of the district is rural, although the district has a number of small cities and medium-sized towns, such as Albany, Americus, Bainbridge, and Thomasville. It also contains most of Columbus and most of Macon. The district is also the historic and current home of former President Jimmy Carter.

The 2nd district is one of the most consistently Democratic in the country, as Democrats have held it since 1875. However, it has grown far less heavily blue in recent years due to shifting demographics. With a PVI of D+3, it is the least Democratic majority-black district in the United States.

The district's boundaries were redrawn following the 2010 Census, which granted an additional congressional seat to Georgia. In 2021, following the 2020 Census, the 156th Georgia General Assembly passed new congressional maps signed by Governor Kemp, and redrew this district from 51% African American to 49% African American, beginning in 2023.

Counties

Recent results in statewide elections

List of members representing the district

Election results

2002

2004

2006

2008

2010

2012

2014

2016

2018

2020

2022

See also

Georgia's congressional districts
List of United States congressional districts

References

 Congressional Biographical Directory of the United States 1774–present

External links
 PDF map of Georgia's 2nd district at nationalatlas.gov
 Georgia's 2nd district at GovTrack.us

02